Dimitri Zhdanov (born 14 October 1969) is a Russian former professional racing cyclist. He rode in four editions of the Tour de France.

Major results

1987
1st  Team time trial, UCI Junior Road World Championships
1988
1st  Overall Vuelta a Navarra
1st Stage 1a Vuelta al Táchira
3rd Overall Vuelta a Cantabria
5th Overall Circuit Cycliste Sarthe
1989
2nd Overall Circuit Franco Belge
1st Stage 5a (ITT)
1990
1st  Overall Circuit Cycliste Sarthe
1st Stage 4a
1st  Overall Tour de Normandie
1st Stages 3a & 3b
1st  Overall Tour of Sweden
1st Stage 5a (ITT)
1st  Overall Redlands Bicycle Classic
1st Stage 3
1st Stage 11 Ruta Mexico
4th Overall Tour DuPont
1991
6th Overall Critérium International
6th Overall 4 Jours de Dunkerque
8th Overall Ronde van Nederland
1992
1st Trofeo Pantalica
1st Stage 4 (TTT) Tour de France
7th Overall Vuelta a Murcia
7th Overall Ronde van Nederland
1993
1st Tour de Vendée
2nd GP de Fourmies
7th Overall Tour de Suisse
9th Overall Vuelta a Andalucía

Grand Tour general classification results timeline

References

External links

1969 births
Living people
Russian male cyclists
Cyclists from Moscow